Antonio Reyes González (born 16 October 1964) is a Spanish retired footballer who played as a midfielder.

Football career
Brought up at local Real Betis, Reyes made his debut for the first team in 1983–84 (15 minutes in a 0–0 home draw against FC Barcelona), but only amassed 25 La Liga appearances across his first three seasons. He played significantly more in the following two, with a career-best 34 games and two goals in 1986–87 as the Andalusians ranked in ninth position; during his link to the club, he also spent one season on loan to fellow league side Elche CF, which ended in relegation.

Upon leaving the Verdiblancos in 1990, Reyes resumed his career in the second division, with brief stints in the third. In the former category, he represented Xerez CD, Villarreal CF, CP Mérida – achieving top flight promotion with the team in 1995 – and UD Almería, which would be his last spell in the division. He retired professionally at the age of 32 with top flight totals of 130 games and seven goals (adding 165/20 in level two).

External links
 
 Real Betis Profile

1964 births
Living people
Spanish footballers
Footballers from Seville
Association football midfielders
Real Betis players
Lorca Deportiva CF footballers
Elche CF players
Orihuela CF players
Xerez CD footballers
Villarreal CF players
CP Mérida footballers
UD Almería players
Écija Balompié players
La Liga players
Segunda División players
Segunda División B players